Lila Nath Shrestha (born 28 January 1962) is a Nepali communist politician and a member of the House of Representatives of the federal parliament of Nepal. He was the former Minister of Law, Justice and Parliamentary Affairs and also served as  Minister of Women, Children and Senior Citizens  . He joined politics as a student and has remained a prominent communist politician from Siraha District.

Biography
Born on 28 January 1962 to Jit Bahadur and Dhan Maya Shrestha, in Chandralalpur-2 of Siraha, he is a graduate in Law and has two children – a son and a daughter.

He joined politics as a student in 1980, and went on to become a prominent member of the student wing of CPN ML, ANNFSU, and later the youth wing of CPN UML. He was a long-time member and prominent leader of CPN UML in Siraha District, until the party's dissolution in 2018. Following the merger of CPN UML and CPN (Maoist Centre), he was appointed the "District Incharge" of Siraha for the newly formed Nepal Communist Party (NCP). 

He was the candidate for the second constituent assembly in the 2013 election from CPN UML, but was defeated by Pushpa Kamal Dahal, chairman of the CPN (Maoist) party.

He was finally elected to the House of Representatives for the first time in the 2017 legislative election. He was elected from Siraha-3 constituency under the first-past-the-post system representing CPN UML of the left alliance. He defeated his nearest rival, Asheswor Yadav, by acquiring 23,227 votes to Yadav's 21,220.

See also 

 Pramod Kumar Yadav

References

Living people
1962 births
Communist Party of Nepal (Unified Marxist–Leninist) politicians
People from Siraha District
Communist Party of Nepal (Marxist–Leninist) politicians
Nepal Communist Party (NCP) politicians
21st-century Nepalese lawyers
20th-century Nepalese lawyers
Newar
Nepal MPs 2017–2022
Nepal MPs 2022–present